Akhi Jahan (also Romanized as Ākhī Jahān and Akhījahān; also known as Ākhar-e Jahān) is a village in Qazi Jahan Rural District, Howmeh District, Azarshahr County, East Azerbaijan Province, Iran. At the 2006 census, its population was 2,290, in 589 families.

References 

Populated places in Azarshahr County